Evenwood railway station served the village of Evenwood, County Durham, England from 1858 to 1962 on the South Durham and Lancashire Union Railway.

History 
The station opened on 13 October 1858 by the North Eastern Railway. It was originally on the Hagger Leases branch but it was relocated in May 1864. It closed to passengers on 14 October 1957 and closed to goods traffic on 18 June 1962.

References

External links 

Disused railway stations in County Durham
Former North Eastern Railway (UK) stations
Railway stations opened in 1858
Railway stations closed in 1962
1858 establishments in England
1962 disestablishments in England
Railway stations in Great Britain opened in the 19th century